Limana is a comune (municipality) in the province of Belluno in the Italian region of Veneto, located about  north of Venice and about  southwest of Belluno.

Limana is situated in the middle of Valbelluna, at the foot of prealpi and in front of the dolomites massif, crossed by the river Piave in the north side.
The commune belongs to the mountain union called Val Belluna.

Limana borders the following municipalities: Belluno, Revine Lago, Sedico, Trichiana, Vittorio Veneto.

Demographic evolution

Twin towns
Limana is twinned with:

  Grass Valley, California, United States
  Longuyon, France
  Schmitshausen, Germany
  Walferdange, Luxembourg

References

External links 

 

Cities and towns in Veneto